Catalonia Hotel or Hotel Catalunya or variation, may refer to:

 Hotel Torre Catalunya, skyscraper and hotel in Barcelona, Spain
 Hotel Catalonia Plaza Europa, skyscraper and hotel in L'Hospitalet de Llobregat (suburb of Barcelona), Spain

See also

 Catalonia (disambiguation)
 Catalunya (disambiguation)